The Pokeno railway station is a former railway station in Pokeno, New Zealand on the North Island Main Trunk line. It opened for passengers on 20 May 1875, and for goods on 6 April 1879.

The station closed to passengers on 24 June 1973, and to goods on 30 March 1980.

Work on the proposed Paeroa–Pokeno Line commenced in 1938, and whilst approximately 13 km of earthworks were completed at each end, the proposal was halted due to the Second World War. Work was still making slow progress in 1950. The line was to be the first part of the East Coast Main Trunk Railway.

History 
A 4th class stationmasters house and 5th class Class B station were built in 1878. From 1 December 1879 to 31 October 1924 there was a Post Office at the station. By 1884 there was also a platform, cart approach,  by  goods shed, loading bank, cattle yards, urinals and a 21 wagon passing loop. In 1914 the goods shed was moved to the other side of the line and in 1939 Marlborough Street level crossing was closed and the station yard was altered. About 1969 $2,600 was spent on half-arm barriers and alarms at the Cameron Street crossing. In 1974 a hand crane was donated to the Museum of Transport & Technology, which also took kauri planks from the closed station at about the same time. After closure in 1980, the goods shed was used as a workshop and storage area for a railway bridge gang, until vandalism and burglary brought about its demolition in 1981. Traffic grew as shown in the graph and table below.

Proposed reopening 
In 2020, reopening of the station was put forward as a COVID-19 recovery scheme, at an estimated cost of $10m. In 2022 it was said to be at least 10 years away and planned to be on the old station site, between High and Market Streets.

See also 
Paeroa-Pokeno Line 
Paeroa railway station
Taneatua Express

References

External links 

 1930s photo of station
 MOTAT photos of station and goods shed about 1973

Defunct railway stations in New Zealand
Rail transport in Waikato
Buildings and structures in Waikato
Railway stations opened in 1875
Railway stations closed in 1980